The Thai FA Cup 2011 is the 18th season of Thailand knockout football competition. The tournament is organized by the Football Association of Thailand.

The cup winner were guaranteed a place in the 2012 AFC Champions League.

Calendar

Qualifying round

|colspan="3" style="background-color:#99CCCC"|20 April 2011

Prachinburi won because Sananrak Municipality disqualified

First round

|colspan="3" style="background-color:#99CCCC"|20 April 2011

|-
|colspan="3" style="background-color:#99CCCC"|27 April 2011

|-
|colspan="3" style="background-color:#99CCCC"|11 May 2011

|-
|colspan="3" style="background-color:#99CCCC"|25 May 2011

 1 Ratchaburi won because Mukdahan City withdrew

Second round

|colspan="3" style="background-color:#99CCCC"|8 June 2011

|-
|colspan="3" style="background-color:#99CCCC"|15 June 2011

|-
|colspan="3" style="background-color:#99CCCC"|22 June 2011

 2 Songkhla won because Yasothon United withdrew
 3 Thai Honda withdrew before lots of Second round.

Third round

|colspan="3" style="background-color:#99CCCC"|9 July 2011

|-
|colspan="3" style="background-color:#99CCCC"|10 July 2011

|-
|colspan="3" style="background-color:#99CCCC"|16 July 2011

|-
|colspan="3" style="background-color:#99CCCC"|17 July 2011

|-
|colspan="3" style="background-color:#99CCCC"|20 July 2011

|-
|colspan="3" style="background-color:#99CCCC"|27 July 2011

|-
|colspan="3" style="background-color:#99CCCC"|17 August 2011

|-
|colspan="3" style="background-color:#99CCCC"|19 October 2011

 4 (C) is Champion in last season.
 5 (RC) is Runner-up in last season.

Fourth round

|colspan="3" style="background-color:#99CCCC"|4 September 2011

|-
|colspan="3" style="background-color:#99CCCC"|26 October 2011

|-
|}

Fifth round

|colspan="3" style="background-color:#99CCCC"|27 August 2011

|-
|colspan="3" style="background-color:#99CCCC"|28 August 2011

|-
|colspan="3" style="background-color:#99CCCC"|31 August 2011

|-
|colspan="3" style="background-color:#99CCCC"|19 October 2011

|-
|colspan="3" style="background-color:#99CCCC"|26 October 2011

|-
|colspan="3" style="background-color:#99CCCC"|30 November 2011

|-
|}
 1 Police United failed to turn up for their game.

Quarter-finals

|colspan="3" style="background-color:#99CCCC"|4 January 2012

|-
|colspan="3" style="background-color:#99CCCC"|5 January 2012∗

∗The original schedule was January 4 but postponed due to weather condition (heavy rain).

Semi-finals

|colspan="3" style="background-color:#99CCCC"|7 January 2012

Final

|colspan="3" style="background-color:#99CCCC"|11 January 2012

References 

Thai FA Cup seasons
1